The KwaDukuza Local Municipality council consists of fifty-nine members elected by mixed-member proportional representation. Thirty councillors are elected by first-past-the-post voting in thirty wards, while the remaining twenty-nine are chosen from party lists so that the total number of party representatives is proportional to the number of votes received.

In the election of 3 August 2016 the African National Congress (ANC) won a majority of thirty-six seats on the council.

In the election of 1 November 2021 the African National Congress (ANC) lost its majority, obtaining a plurality of twenty-nine seats on the council.

Results 
The following table shows the composition of the council after past elections.

December 2000 election

The following table shows the results of the 2000 election.

March 2006 election

The following table shows the results of the 2006 election.

May 2011 election

The following table shows the results of the 2011 election.

August 2016 election

The following table shows the results of the 2016 election.

November 2021 election

The following table shows the results of the 2021 election.

References

KwaDukuza
Elections in KwaZulu-Natal
KwaDukuza Local Municipality